The 2021–22 Wellington Phoenix season is the club's inaugural season in the A-League Women, the premier competition for women's football in Australia, originally known as the W-League. 

The club's manager for the season is Gemma Lewis, with Natalie Lawrence as assistant.

Due to impacts related to the on-going COVID-19 pandemic in Australia, including not being able to play home games in New Zealand, the team are playing their home games at WIN Stadium located in Wollongong, Australia.

Season milestones
Former Perth Glory keeper and 2020–21 players’ player of the year, Lily Alfeld, was announced as the club's inaugural signing. She was later announced as the club's inaugural captain.

Wellington Phoenix started their debut season with a 0–0 draw against Western Sydney Wanderers at the Wollongong Showgrounds.

Ava Pritchard scored the club's first goal in their second game of the season, in a 1–5 loss to Newcastle Jets.

On 11 February 2022, the Phoenix achieved their first ever win in the A-League Women in a 3–0 away win against Canberra United.

They got their second win of the season against Western Sydney Wanderers, winning 3–2 on the 1st March but it wasn't enough to get them off the bottom of the table and after losing their last game of the season to Perth Glory, they finished the season with the wooden spoon.

Players

Squad information

A-League

League table

Matches

 All times are in AEDT

Results summary

Results by round

Squad statistics

Appearances and goals

|-
|colspan="16"|Goalkeepers:
|-

|-
|colspan="16"|Defenders:
|-

|-
|colspan="16"|Midfielders:
|-

|-
|colspan="16"|Forwards:
|-

|-

Clean sheets
Includes all competitive matches. The list is sorted by squad number when total clean sheets are equal.

Disciplinary records
Includes all competitive matches. The list is sorted by squad number when total disciplinary records are equal.

External links

See also
2021–22 Wellington Phoenix FC season

Notes

References 

Wellington Phoenix FC (A-League Women)